Raghuveer Parthasarathy (born 1976) is an American biophysicist, and an Alec and Kay Keith Professor of Physics on the faculty of the University of Oregon.

Early life and education 
Born in 1976 in Mysore, India, Parthasarathy is the son of Sampath and Kalyani (née Rangaswamy) Parthasarathy. He became a U.S.citizen at age twelve in 1988 in San Diego, California.

Parthasarathy earned an A.B. in physics in 1997 from the University of California, Berkeley, and a Ph.D. physics in 2002 from the University of Chicago, with the dissertation, Electronic transport in arrays of gold nanocrystals, advised by Thomas F. Rosenbaum.

Career 
Following a four year post-doc as a Miller Research Fellow at Berkeley, Parthasarathy joined the physic faculty at the University of Oregon in 2006. As a member of both the Institute of Molecular Biology and the Materials Science Institute, he researches topics of "biophysics, microbial communities, host-microbe interactions, and advanced microscopy techniques".

Since 2016, Parthasarathy has served as co-director of the University of Oregon Science Literacy Program.

Parthasarathy was named Alec and Kay Keith Professor in 2016, and promoted to full professor in 2017.

Selected publications

Books

Articles

Awards, honors 
 In 2020, Parthasarathy was elected a Fellow of the American Physical Society, cited For creative and innovative contributions to biological physics especially to our understanding of the gut microbiome and lipid bilayers.
 2020 Williams Fellow
 2008 National Science Foundation CAREER Award, NSF's Biomaterials Program, providing $475,000 over the five years.
 2007 Alfred P. Sloan Research Fellowship

References

External links 
  (video, 10:48 minutes) 
  (video, 11:36 minutes) 
  (video, 1:20:52 hours) 
 Biophysics W/ Raghuveer Parthasarathy - Audacy ("Talk Nerdy" Podcast, 1:23 hours)

1976 births
American biophysicists
University of California, Berkeley alumni
University of Chicago alumni
University of Oregon faculty
Living people
Fellows of the American Physical Society